The 1989 Pacific hurricane season was the first near normal season since 1981. The season officially started on May 15, 1989, in the eastern Pacific, and June 1, 1989, in the central Pacific, and lasted until November 30, 1989. These dates conventionally delimit the period of each year when most tropical cyclones form in the northeastern Pacific Ocean. A total of 18 storms and 9 hurricanes formed, which was near long-term averages. Four hurricanes reached major hurricane status (Category 3 or higher) on the Saffir–Simpson scale.

Land impacting storms include Hurricanes Cosme, Kiko, and Raymond. Cosme crossed over Mexico and killed 30 people. Hurricane Kiko made landfall on the Gulf of California side of the Baja California Peninsula as a major hurricane. Hurricane Raymond was the strongest storm of the season, but weakened significantly before landfall.



Seasonal summary

Overall, the season continued the general trend in the 1980s of near to above-average seasons in the East Pacific. Seventeen cyclones formed. Eight peaked at tropical storm strength. Nine systems became hurricanes, of which four were major hurricanes at Category 3 intensity or higher on the Saffir–Simpson scale. On August 28, three systems were active, one of a few times when there has been three tropical cyclones active simultaneously (Kiko, Lorena, and Manuel) in the east Pacific (west of 140°W). Despite the activity this season, no named storms formed in October. This was the second consecutive season this happened.

Systems

Tropical Storm Winona

During the second week of January, an upper-level trough located east of Hawaii created an area of divergence to its southeast, allowing an area of low pressure to develop alongside deep convection. Initially, the system was hampered by wind shear as it moved west-northwestward to the south of Hawaii; however, by January 11, the system was able to maintain convection over its center and was classified as a tropical depression. On January 13, it was estimated in post-storm analysis to have become a tropical storm at an unprecedented . Meteorologists at the time struggled to forecast the storm as climatological forecast guidance (modeling based on previous cyclones), was not available due to the uniqueness of Winona. On January 15, the system crossed the International Date Line and entered the Western Pacific basin.

As a tropical depression, Winona brought heavy rains to portions of Hawaii, triggering flash flooding on a few islands. No damage resulted from the floods. After becoming a tropical storm, the system brushed Wake Island, bringing gusty winds and moderate rainfall. Several days later, the storm passed near the Mariana Islands and Guam, bringing tropical storm-force wind gusts and heavy rainfall. Minor damage resulted from Winona but there was no loss of life. Operationally, this system was not classified a tropical storm until January 16, thus it was not warned upon by the Central Pacific Hurricane Center during its early stages.

Tropical Storm Adolph

The first storm of the season developed out of a weak area of low pressure situated about 570 mi (925 km) south-southwest of Acapulco, Mexico. Tracking towards the west, the circulation briefly dissipated on May 30, before redeveloping the following day into Tropical Depression One-E. A  ridge of high pressure north of the system steered it towards the west-northwest. By 0600 UTC on June 1, the National Hurricane Center (NHC) upgraded the depression to a tropical storm and gave it the name Adolph. Adolph continued to strengthen until early on June 2, at which time it reached its peak intensity with winds of 65 mph (100 km/h) and a minimum pressure of 994 mbar (hPa). Shortly after peaking, cool, dry air became entrained in the circulation, preventing further intensification. Early on June 3, Adolph weakened slightly due to unfavorable conditions. Later that day, Adolph briefly re-intensified. On June 4, strong wind shear displaced convection associated with the storm to the west of the center of circulation; this resulted in Adolph weakening to a tropical depression by 1800 UTC that day, and Adolph persisted until June 5 at which time it dissipated.

Hurricane Barbara

On June 10, an area of disturbed weather was located several hundred miles southwest of Acapulco, Mexico, and the system slowed to a westward drift. After gradually becoming better organized, the NHC estimated that the wave spawned Tropical Depression Two-E around 1800 UTC on June 15. Initially, the depression towards the northwest before a ridge of high pressure situated over Mexico caused the storm to turn towards the west-northwest. Based on improving satellite presentation, the NHC upgraded the depression to Tropical Storm Barbara. With favorable conditions, Barbara continued to intensify, attaining hurricane-status roughly 24 hours after being named. Six hours later, the storm reached its peak intensity with winds of 80 mph (130 km/h). Satellite images early on June 18 showed that cool, dry air was becoming entrained into the northern inflow of the storm and Barbara was nearing cooler waters. These factors led to the storm weakening below hurricane intensity by 0000 UTC on June 19. Wind shear at this time also began to increase, displacing all convection associated with the storm to the northeast of the center. By June 20, the former hurricane was further downgraded to a tropical depression. The NHC issued their final advisory on the system early on June 21; however, the remnants of the storm persisted until June 27.

Hurricane Cosme

On June 18 a tropical disturbance formed several hundred miles off the coast of Mexico. Ships in the vicinity of the storm, in addition to satellite images, indicated that the disturbance had developed into Tropical Depression Three-E around 1800 UTC.  Remaining nearly stationary, the depression gradually strengthened into a tropical storm by June 20, receiving the name Cosme at that time. Early on June 21, Cosme began to track towards the north and intensify. Around 1200 UTC, Cosme strengthened into a Category 1 hurricane on the Saffir–Simpson scale. Several hours later, Cosme reached its peak intensity. Late on June 21, the center of the hurricane made landfall on the Mexican coast, just east of Acapulco with winds of 80 mph (130 km/h). The low associated with the former hurricane was last identified near Brownsville, Texas.

Cosme brought heavy rains, which killed at least 30 people due to drowning. Many adobe homes were destroyed, but a specific cost of damage is not known.

Tropical Depression Four-E

The fourth tropical cyclone of the season formed as a well-organized depression on July 9. Deep convection associated with the system indicated that intensification into a tropical storm was possible. The system track generally westward in response to high-pressure system to the north. On July 10, the depression quickly became disorganized, with only a small area of convection around the center remaining by midday. Although the depression was nearly at tropical storm intensity, the NHC held off on upgrading it due to its proximity to Tropical Depression Five-E. However, the system failed to intensify. By July 11, the depression entered the Central Pacific hurricane center's area of responsibility. Tracking generally northwest, the system slowly weakened before dissipating on July 14 to the south of Hawaii.

Tropical Depression Five-E

On July 10, a tropical depression formed far from land. Upon formation, there was uncertainty of the location of center. Shortly thereafter, the system became sheared and further intensification was no longer anticipated. On July 11, the low-level center became displaced form the deep convection.
the next day, the center was relocated, and moved to the west. While the NHC noted the possibility of intensification, the depression was forecasted to dissipate in 36 hours. It failed to intensify, and  moved into the Central Pacific on July 14. The fast-moving tropical depression dissipated two days later. The remnants of the depression passed far to the south of Hawaii, thus there was no damage.

Hurricane Dalilia

On July 9, a defined low-pressure system formed south of Baja California and increased convective activity led to the NHC classifying it Tropical Depression Six-E on July 11. About 24 hours later, the depression intensified into Tropical Storm Dalilia. By July 13, Dalilia had intensified into a minimal hurricane as it tracked generally toward the northwest. Two days later, the storm took a nearly due west track, which it maintained until July 19. Although the storm tracked near cool waters, a well-developed outflow allowed it to maintain hurricane-intensity. Shortly before crossing into the Central Pacific basin, the storm reached its peak intensity with winds of 90 mph (150 km/h) and a central pressure of 977 mbar (hPa). After crossing 140°W, Dalilia weakened to a minimal hurricane. The storm maintained this intensity until July 19, at which time the system slowed and turned northwest. The following day, the weakening tropical storm brushed the Hawaiian Islands to the south, eventually curving away from the island chain on July 21. Later that day, Dalilia further weakened to a tropical depression, with the Central Pacific Hurricane Center issuing their final advisory at that time. The remnants of the former hurricane continued to track northwest.

While tracking near the Hawaiian islands, Dalilia produced waves up to  along south-facing coastlines. Along the coasts of Ka'u and South Kona, winds gusted up to 45 mph (75 km/h); the winds caused minor damage Along the southeast slopes of Mauna Loa, heavy rains caused minor flooding which forced transit officials to shut down several roads.

Tropical Depression Seven-E

On July 16, an area of disturbed weather located  organized into a tropical depression. Upon formation, the NHC did not anticipate significant intensification due to it close distance to both cooler waters and Hurricane Dalilia. The next day, however, the center became difficult to locate and the system was no longer forecast to intensity. By the night, only minimal deep convection remained. The depression soon moved into cold water and as such the system was expected to dissipate within 24 hours. It dissipated the next day. The remnants of this system contributed to a surge in the monsoon trough that led to the formation of Tropical Storm Erick. This system never impacted land, and thus no damage or deaths were reported.

Tropical Storm Erick

On July 16, there was a surge in convection in the monsoon trough. Early that day, the system was upgraded to a tropical depression. Upon becoming a tropical cyclone, only slight intensification was anticipated. The system intensified to a tropical storm 24 hours after forming. Erick soon moved into cooler waters. This quickly weakened the cyclone and was downgraded to a tropical depression on July 20. It dissipated the next day, without ever impacting any land masses.

Tropical Storm Flossie

Flossie originated from a tropical wave that entered the Pacific Ocean on July 20. The system began to show signs of organization two days later. Continuing to organize, the system was upgraded Tropical Depression Nine-E on July 23. Despite being located over warm waters, only gradual intensification was anticipated. It strengthened into Tropical Storm Flossie the next day. Shortly thereafter the upgraded, convection began to diminish. The cyclone then drifted northwest. The upper-level environment rapidly changed, and the cyclones convection became disorganized. The convection separated from the center of circulation. The cluster of convection developed a new center of circulation on July 24. The original center drifted away from Flossie for 12 hours before dissipating. The new center, which was still a tropical storm, drifted northwest. Flossie then encountered an unfavorable environment, and weakened into a depression on July 25. Flossie continued drifting to the northwest until dissipating July 28, while just off the coast of the Baja California Peninsula. Despite its close distance to Mexico, no damage or deaths were reported.

Hurricane Gil

Gil formed from an area of disturbed weather located near the Mexico–Guatemala border developed a circulation in the Gulf of Tehuantepec and then dissipated. On July 30, the disturbance redeveloped a circulation and then convection. It paralleled the coast of Mexico and headed in a northwesterly direction. The low continued to organize, and was upgraded into a tropical depression. Initially, there was some uncertain in the storms future path, and there was a possibility of the system recurving towards the coast. It strengthened into a tropical storm on July 31. The system continued to become better organized, with further intensification foretasted because the low was located over very warm waters; and was upgraded into a hurricane that same day. Shortly thereafter, the cyclone developed an eye. Gil was a hurricane for only about 30 hours, and it began to encounter dry air. By the August 1, Gil had lost hurricane intensity. It was downgraded to a tropical depression the next day. The cyclone dissipated on August 5.

The heavy rains may have triggered deadly flooding and landslides; however, no reports from Mexican officials have been received to confirm this. However, officials reported  of rain in a 12-hour period.

Hurricane Ismael

A tropical wave crossed Central America on August 11, and then became an area of low pressure. While located of the coast of Mexico it became better organized on August 14. This was enough to warrant an upgrade to Tropical Depression Eleven-E. This system slowly became better organized, but northerly wind shear prevent rapid intensification. Initially, this system was slow to intensify. After strengthening into Tropical Storm Ismael, it closely paralleled the coast of Mexico, Ismael turned to the west. It would maintain that generally westerly direction for the rest of its long path across the Pacific Ocean. The system steadily intensified, and by August 16, Ismael had developed a fair outflow. It reached hurricane strength later that day. Continuing to intensify, the hurricane reached Category 2 intensity. However, the system was not expect to intensify further due to cool sea surface temperatures. However, Ismael managed reached Category 3 status. It then reached a peak intensity of 120 mph (195 km/h) and a peak pressure of 955 millibars. Shortly after its peak, Ismael underwent fluctuations in strength. On August 21, Ismael passed over cooler waters. In addition, the storm encountered strong wind shear. The hostile environment continued to take its toll on Ismael, and it weakened to a tropical storm on August 23. Ismael dissipated not long after weakening to a depression on August 25. The remains of Ismael, which was only a swirl of clouds, dissipated near Hawaii.

Between August 15 and 17, the outer bands of Ismael produced heavy rains along coastal areas of Mexico between Acapulco and Manzanillo, Colima. At least three people were killed by flooding triggered by the storm; however, no structural damage was reported. Despite the rainfall, there were no reports of flooding. The remnants of the hurricane passed near Hawaii, but did not pose a threat.

Tropical Storm Henriette

On August 12, a tropical wave formed in the Pacific Ocean. it steadily organized into the twelfth tropical depression of the season early on August 14. It slowly strengthened and was named Henriette after strengthening into a tropical storm. On August 16, after becoming devoid of any convection, it was downgraded into tropical depression status on August 16. Henriette degenerated into a remnant low on August 17. The low persisted for a few more days until completely dissipating.

Tropical Storm Juliette

A surge in convection in the monsoon trough caused by nearby Hurricane Ismael interacted with a tropical wave to form the thirteenth tropical depression of the season on August 21. Despite strong wind shear caused by Ismael, the depression strengthened into Tropical Storm Juliette on August 22 as a strong burst of convection occurred. After Ismael dissipated, steering currents collapsed, and Juliette moved over cool waters in the open ocean for several days. In addition, strong wind shear took toll on the system. The low had completely dissipated during the evening of August 25. Juliette never impacted land.

Hurricane Kiko

On August 25, the seasons fourteenth tropical depression formed off the coast of Sonora, Mexico from a mesoscale convective system. A small cyclone, the system rapidly intensified over the warm waters of the Gulf of California, becoming Tropical Storm Kiko hours after forming and a hurricane 12 hours later. The fast rate of strengthening continued until August 27, at which time Kiko peaked in intensity as a strong Category 3 hurricane with winds of 120 mph (195 km/h) and a minimum pressure of 955 mbar (hPa; 28.2 inHg). Slight weakening occurred before the storm made landfall near Punta Arena, Mexico, becoming one of the strongest storms to make landfall in Mexico since reliable records began in 1949. The hurricane quickly weakened as it moved over the Baja Peninsula, being downgraded to a tropical depression before emerging into the Pacific Ocean on August 28. The following day, the remnants of Kiko were absorbed by the nearby Hurricane Lorena.

Although Kiko was a major hurricane upon landfall, little damage resulted from the storm. However, 20 homes were destroyed and numerous highways were flooded by torrential rains.

Hurricane Lorena

In the Atlantic, a tropical wave spawned Tropical Depression Six. Twenty four hours later, wind shear degenerated the depression back into a wave. The wave continued westward, and in the southern Caribbean, split in two on August 21. The southern part crossed Central America and emerged into the Pacific Ocean. Banding and convection steadily organized, and Tropical Depression Fifteen-E formed on August 27. It strengthened into Tropical Storm Lorena the next day. At this time, three systems were active and in close proximity. Lorena and a weakening Kiko started a Fujiwhara interaction. Lorena eventually became the dominate system, and absorbed the remnants of Kiko on August 29. Moving slowly out to sea, Lorena reached minimal hurricane strength on the September 1 as the convection became more concentrated. Lorena was a hurricane for less than a day. It weakened quickly to a depression on September 3. The cyclone was devoid of convection by September 7, and was thus declared a remnant low. The system never affected land.

Tropical Storm Manuel

An area of thunderstorms organized into a tropical depression on August 28. The next day, convection increased near the center, and was respectively upgraded into a tropical storm. Manuel gradually strengthened, reaching a peak of 45 mph (75 km/h). Manuel approached to within  of Lorena. Due to its proximity to the storm, Manuel lost its center circulation on August 31. The storms only impact on land was light rainfall near Manzanillo, Colima. No reports of death or damage were reported.

Tropical Storm Narda

On September 2, a tropical wave began showing sings of organization, and on September 3, it organized into a tropical depression. Upon becoming a tropical cyclone, Narda was located over warm sea surface temperatures. Moving rapidly, to the west-northwest, Narda strengthened into a tropical storm. Strong wind shear prevented significant intensification beyond minimal tropical storm strength, with winds peaking at 50 mph (75 km/h). Initially, Narda managed to produce brief burst of convection. By September 7, however,  Narda was devoid of convection, and was respectively downgraded to a tropical depression. It never impacted land.

Hurricane Octave

At low latitude in the Atlantic, Tropical Depression Nine formed from a tropical wave on August 28. The depression degenerated the next day due to strong wind shear. The wave continued drifting westward, and entered the Pacific Ocean on the September 2. It slowly developed, and organized into Tropical Depression Eighteen-E on September 8. The cyclone turned northwestward, and strengthened into Tropical Storm Octave on September 10. After strengthening into a hurricane the next day, Octave started deepening. After peaking as a Category 4 on September 13 with  winds, Octave moved into a region of cooler waters and strong shear. Octave weakened to a storm at midday on September 14 and a depression 32 hours later. The depression hooked to the east, and dissipated on September 18 near Guadalupe Island. The remnants eventually turned to the north before dissipating.

While Octave had no significant effects on land as a hurricane, its remnants did move into California.  In the Sacramento Valley, the town of Redding recorded  of rain in a 12-hour span.

Tropical Storm Priscilla

Tropical Depression Nineteen-E organized from an area of low pressure on September 21. Upon being upgraded, the depression was anticipated to slowly strengthen, becoming a strong tropical storm in three days. Moving northwestward, it was named Priscilla the next day. Continuing to intensify, it reached its peak intensity of 65 mph (100 km/h). Due to its close proximity to the cooler waters, Priscilla began weakening almost immediately thereafter. The cyclone weakened into a tropical depression on September 24 and dissipated the next day .

Although Priscilla did not directly impact land as a tropical cyclone, the remnant moisture enhanced a non-tropical low off the California coastline, resulting in heavy rainfall along the Pacific coast of the United States.

Tropical Depression Twenty-E

On September 24, Tropical Depression Twenty-E formed southwest of Guatemala. Although  convection increased, significant development was not anticipated due to its proximity to land. It was also forecasted to make landfall in 36 hours.  A small cyclone, its close distance to Hurricane Raymond hindered development. Moving very little, the winds soon diminished. The depression dissipated on September 27.
When the depression was anticipated to make landfall in Mexico. As such, the NHC noted the possibility of heavy rains especially over the higher elevations. However, no impact was reported from the tropical cyclone.

Hurricane Raymond

Tropical Depression Twenty One-E formed from part of the same tropical wave that had earlier spawned Hurricane Hugo. Moving slowly to the west-northwest, it accelerated to the northwest in response to a trough and strengthened into the seventeenth named storm of the season on September 26. Raymond turned to the west again and entered a favourable environment. Raymond eventually peaked as a Category 4 hurricane and the strongest storm of the season on October 1. A trough over Mexico destroyed the ridge that was steering Raymond and recurved the cyclone to the northeast. Raymond made landfall as a tropical storm on October 4. Northern Mexico's mountains disrupted Raymond's circulation, and dissipated over New Mexico on October 5 after passing over that state and Arizona as a depression.

Since Raymond had significantly weakened prior to its first landfall, only minor impacts were recorded in Mexico. In the city, the swollen Santa Cruz River destroyed a heavily traveled bridge, known as the Calle Obregon, and destroyed a store which was situated on the banks of the river. Mexican officials estimated damages at $250,000 (1989 USD, $  USD). The remnants of the storm tracked into the Southwest United States and further into the Central United States before dissipating. One person was killed in a mobile home which was destroyed by high winds. Flash flooding triggered by Raymond caused an estimated $1.5 million (1989 USD, $  USD) in damages in Arizona.

Tropical Depression Twenty Two-E

Upon becoming a tropical cyclone, the cyclone was located in a favorable environment. Later that day, convection increased, but the NHC did not upgrade the system into a tropical storm. However, increased wind shear quickly caused the system to become exposed. After drifting westbound, it did not become a tropical storm and dissipated on October 4. However, it regenerated on October 7 as deep convection  had developed near the center for about 12 hours. Upon regenerating, it was forecasted to intensify into a strong tropical storm as it was expected to turn to the north. Shortly thereafter, the system became less organized; it dissipated again the next day. The depression never threatened land.

Tropical Depression Twenty Three-E

However, during October 16, all of the deep convection associated with 23E dissipated, before the National Hurricane Center issued its final advisory during the next day.

Tropical Depression Twenty Four-E

On October 18, the NHC began issuing advisories on Tropical Depression Twenty Four-E. Although the depression was located within an area of high wind shear, convection had managed to partially develop around the center of circulation. A ship nearby the system reported sustained winds of 40 mph (65 km/h); however, the winds were not considered to be representative of the actual intensity of the depression. Further intensification was not expected as the depression tracked in a northward direction Shortly after the first advisory was issued, convection rapidly dissipated, leaving an exposed low-pressure area, devoid of shower and thunderstorm activity. The system was forecast to dissipate within 36 hours due to high shear. Late on October 18, the forward motion of the depression abruptly changed towards the west. The final advisory on Tropical Depression Twenty Four-E was issued during the afternoon of October 19 as the system remained devoid of convection; redevelopment of the system was not anticipated due to unfavorable conditions.

Storm names
The following names were used for named storms that formed in the eastern Pacific in 1989. Since no names were retired, no new names were replaced for the 1995 season. However, the name Dalilia was later changed to Dalila through a misspelling of the name. The changed spelling has remained in use since 1995. Names that were not assigned are marked in gray. Winnie would later trade years with Wallis in future seasons.

Central Pacific
Starting in the early 1980s, the Central Pacific Hurricane Center assigned names to tropical storms that formed between the 180° to 140°W. Names for the basin are taken off a single list due to the low frequency of storms in the area. Had a tropical storm formed in the Central Pacific during 1989, it would have received the name Aka. The first six names on the list that could have been used are listed below.

Season effects
This is a table of all the storms that have formed in the 1989 Pacific hurricane season. It includes their duration, names, landfall(s), denoted in parentheses, damages, and death totals. Deaths in parentheses are additional and indirect (an example of an indirect death would be a traffic accident), but were still related to that storm. Damage and deaths include totals while the storm was extratropical, a wave, or a low, and all the damage figures are in 1989 USD.

|-
| Winona ||  || bgcolor=#| || bgcolor=#| || bgcolor=#| || None ||  None ||  None ||
|-
| Adolph ||  || bgcolor=#| || bgcolor=#| || bgcolor=#| || None ||  None ||  None ||
|-
| Barbara ||  || bgcolor=#| || bgcolor=#| || bgcolor=#| || None ||  None ||  None ||
|-
| Cosme ||  || bgcolor=#| || bgcolor=#| || bgcolor=#| || Guerrero, Mexico ||  Unknown ||  ||
|-
| 04E ||  || bgcolor=#| || bgcolor=#| || bgcolor=#| || None ||  None ||  None ||
|-
| 05E ||  || bgcolor=#| || bgcolor=#| || bgcolor=#| || None ||  None ||  None ||
|-
| Dalilia ||  || bgcolor=#| || bgcolor=#| ||  bgcolor=#| || Hawaii ||  Minor ||  None ||
|-
| 07E ||  || bgcolor=#| || bgcolor=#| || bgcolor=#| || None ||  None ||  None ||
|-
| Erick ||  || bgcolor=#| || bgcolor=#| || bgcolor=#| || None ||  None ||  None ||
|-
| Flossie ||  || bgcolor=#| || bgcolor=#| || bgcolor=#| || None ||  None ||  None ||
|-
| Gil ||  || bgcolor=#| || bgcolor=#| || bgcolor=#| || None ||  None ||  None ||
|-
| Ismael ||  || bgcolor=#| || bgcolor=#| || bgcolor=#| || Colima and Guerrero Pacific coast ||  None ||  || 
|-
| Henriette ||  || bgcolor=#| || bgcolor=#| || bgcolor=#| || None ||  None ||  None ||
|-
| Juliette ||  || bgcolor=#| || bgcolor=#| || bgcolor=#| || None ||  None ||  None ||
|-
| Kiko ||  || bgcolor=#| || bgcolor=#| || bgcolor=#| || Baja California Sur, Western Mexico ||  Minor ||  None ||
|-
| Lorena ||  || bgcolor=#| || bgcolor=#| || bgcolor=#| || None ||  None ||  None ||
|-
| Manuel ||  || bgcolor=#| || bgcolor=#| || bgcolor=#| || None ||  None ||  None ||
|-
| Narda ||  || bgcolor=#| || bgcolor=#| || bgcolor=#| || None ||  None ||  None ||
|-
| Octave ||  || bgcolor=#| || bgcolor=#| || bgcolor=#| || None ||  None ||  None ||
|-
| Priscilla ||  || bgcolor=#| || bgcolor=#| || bgcolor=#| || None ||  None ||  None ||
|-
| 20E ||  || bgcolor=#| || bgcolor=#| || bgcolor=#| || None ||  None ||  None ||
|-
| Raymond ||  || bgcolor=#| || bgcolor=#| || bgcolor=#| || Baja California Peninsula, Northeastern Mexico ||  ||  ||
|-
| 22E ||  || bgcolor=#| || bgcolor=#| || bgcolor=#| || None ||  None ||  None ||
|-
| 23E ||  || bgcolor=#| || bgcolor=#| || bgcolor=#| || None ||  None ||  None ||
|-
| 24E ||  || bgcolor=#| || bgcolor=#| || bgcolor=#| || None ||  None ||  None ||
|-

See also

List of Pacific hurricanes
Pacific hurricane season
1989 Atlantic hurricane season
1989 Pacific typhoon season
1989 North Indian Ocean cyclone season
 South-West Indian Ocean cyclone seasons: 1988–89, 1989–90
 Australian region cyclone seasons: 1988–89, 1989–90
 South Pacific cyclone seasons: 1988–89, 1989–90

References

External links
NHC 1989 Pacific hurricane season archive
Central Pacific Hurricane Center archive

 
Pacific hurricane seasons
Articles which contain graphical timelines